The Clarence Derwent Awards are theatre awards given annually by the Actors' Equity Association on Broadway in the United States and by Equity, the performers' union, in the West End in the United Kingdom.

Clarence Derwent (23 March 1884 – 6 August 1959) was an English actor, director, and manager. He was educated at St Paul's School, London and the Birkbeck Institute. He joined Sir Frank Benson's stage company, with whom he stayed for five years. He then joined Annie Horniman's repertory company in Manchester. He was seen in a great variety of roles, both in London and New York. He made his last appearance on stage in 1948 in The Madwoman of Chaillot. He died in New York at the age of 75.

From 1946 to 1952 Derwent was President of America's Actors' Equity. His will stipulated that two $500 prizes were to be given out annually to the best individual male and female supporting performances on Broadway and a £100 prize to the best supporting performances in the West End. So that Derwent could have the gratification of seeing the awards given out,  they were started in America in 1945 and in the UK in 1948. The prizes in the US are now $2,000 and an engraved crystal trophy.

Equity introduced Student awards in 2006.

Winners (US)

Most promising male

1940s

1950s

1960s

1970s

1980s

1990s

2000s

2010s

Most Promising Female

1940s

1950s

1960s

1970s

1980s

1990s

2000s

2010s

Winners (UK)

Best male in a supporting role
 1948 Colin Gordon as Rupert Billings in The Happiest Days of Your Life
 1949 Robin Bailey as Faulkland in The Rivals
 1950 Denholm Elliott as Edgar in Venus Observed
 1951 Hugh Griffith as The Father in Point of Departure
 1952 Paul Rogers as William Villon in The Other Heart
 1953 Ernest Clark as Dr Skillingworth in Escapade
 1954 Richard Wordsworth as Antonio in Venice Preserv'd
 1955 Noel Willman as Interrogator in The Prisoner
 1956 Timothy Bateson as Lucky in Waiting for Godot
 1957 Derek Godfrey as Iachimo in Cymbeline
 1958 Paul Daneman as Henry VI in Henry VI, parts I, II and III 1959 Alan Bates as Edmund Tyrone in Long Day's Journey into Night 1960 Alec McCowen as Touchstone in As You Like It 1961 Peter Woodthorpe as Aston in The Caretaker 1962 John Moffatt as Cardinal Cajetan in Luther 1963 Frank Finlay as Corporal Hill in Chips with Everything 1964 Charles Gray as Maxim in Poor Bitos 1965 Ian McKellen as Godfrey in A Scent of Flowers 1966 Edward Hardwicke as Camille Chandebise in A Flea in Her Ear 1967 Paul Eddington as Capt M Doleful in Jorrocks 1968 Timothy West as Otto in The Italian Girl 1969 Gordon Jackson as Horatio in Hamlet 1970 Robert Eddison as Lightborn in Edward II 1971 Michael Bates as Charles Bisley in Forget-me-not Lane 1972 Richard O'Callaghan as Joey in Butley 1973 Alan MacNaughtan as Philinte in The Misanthrope 1974 John Tordoff as The Man in Misalliance 1975 Mike Gwilym as Death in King John 1976 Peter Blythe as Peter Frame in The Chairman 1977 Nigel Hawthorne as Major Flack in Privates on Parade 1978 Jeremy Irons as Jameson in Rear Column 1979 Michael Bryant as Sir Paul Plyant in Double Dealer (play) 1980 Richard Griffiths as Lariosik in White Guard 1981 David Threlfall as Smike in Nicholas Nickleby 1982 Harold Innocent as Cayley Drummle in The Second Mrs Tanqueray 1983 Michael Aldridge as Selsdon Mowbray in Noises Off 1984 Bill Fraser as Pischik in The Cherry Orchard 1985 David Ryall as Sicinius Velutus in Coriolanus 1986 Charles Kay as Lord Charles Canteloupe in Waste 1987 Frank Grimes as Ned in Holiday 1988 Clive Francis as The Detective in A Small Family Business 1989 Niall Buggy as Casimir in Aristocrats 1990 Desmond Barrit as Trinculo in The Tempest 1991 Terence Rigby as Dr Relling in The Wild Duck 1992 Lennie James as Mickey Jones in The Coup 1993 David Bradley as Shallow in Henry IV, Part 2 and Polonius in Hamlet 1994 Nicholas Le Prevost as Pontagnac in An Absolute Turkey 1995 Philip Locke as Lyndkvist in Easter 1996 Tony Haygarth as Simms the bookmaker in Simpatico 1997 Stephen Boxer as Barnabas Goche in The Herbal Bed 1998 Alan Dobie as The Fool in King Lear 1999 David Yelland as Buckingham in Richard III 2000 Roger Allam as Ulysses in Troilus and Cressida 2001 Malcolm Sinclair as Gavin Ryng-Mayne in House & Garden 2002 Ian McDiarmid as Teddy in Faith Healer 2003 Bette Bourne as Pauncefort Quentin in The Vortex 2004 Simon Trinder as Biondello in The Taming of the Shrew 2005 Adrian Scarborough as Ivan Ivanovitch in The Mandate 2006 John Wood as Swallow in Henry IV, Part 2 2007 Geoffrey Hutchings as Herr Schultz in Cabaret 2008 Phil Davis as Vassilly in The Philistines 2009 Clifford Rose as The Judge in The Chalk Garden 2010 Stanley Townsend as Theseus in Phèdre 2011 William Gaunt as Worcester and Shallow in Henry IV, Part 1 and Henry IV, Part 2 2012 Danny Webb as Harry Kahn in Chicken Soup with Barley 2013 Paul Chahidi as Maria in Twelfth Night 2014 Charles Edwards as Charles Marsden in Strange Interlude 2015 Adam James as Prime Minister Tristram Evans
 2017 Peter Polycarpou as Ahmed Qurei in Oslo; Jonjo O'Neill as Ivan in Unreachable and Cymbeline in Cymbeline 2018 Irfan Shamji as Harry in Mayfly, John in One for Sorrow, and Luke in Dance Nation 2019 Hammed Animashaun  for two performances: Willie in Master Harold and the Boys at the National Theatre and Bottom in A Midsummer Night's Dream at the Bridge

Best female in a supporting role
 1948 Jessica Spencer as Barbara Martin in Royal Circle 1949 Gwen Cherrell as Cherry in The Beaux' Stratagem 1950 Daphne Arthur as Margaret in The Holly and the Ivy 1951 Frances Rowe as Alex Cornwall in Who Goes There! 1952 Valerie Hanson as Marionetta in Nightmare Abbey 1953 Brenda De Banzie as Freda Jefferies in Murder Mistaken 1954 Patricia Jessel as Romaine in Witness for the Prosecution 1955 Beryl Measor as The Housekeeper in Separate Tables 1956 Margaret Vines as Gibbs in Morning at Seven 1957 Megs Jenkins as Beatrice in A View from the Bridge 1958 Lally Bowers as Madame Montrachet in Dinner with the Family 1959 Avice Landone as Mrs Sylvia Bennett in Not in the Book 1960 Pauline Jameson as Mrs Prest in The Aspern Papers 1961 Rachel Roberts as Anna Petrovna in Platonov 1962 Judi Dench as Anya in The Cherry Orchard 1963 Jessie Evans as Miriam Morton in The Keep 1964 Eileen Atkins as Juliet in Exit the King 1965 Jeanne Hepple as Mary Warren in The Crucible 1966 Gemma Jones as Adele in The Cavern 1967 Vickery Turner as Sandy in The Prime of Miss Jean Brodie 1968 Anne Dyson as Mrs Gascoyne in The Daughter-in-law 1969 Elizabeth Spriggs as Claire in A Delicate Balance 1970 Denise Coffey as Aurora Botterill in The Bandwagon 1971 Rosemary McHale as Joanne in Slag 1972 Heather Canning as Christine in Miss Julie 1973 Bridget Turner as Anna in Time and Time Again 1974 Anna Carteret as Virginia in Saturday, Sunday, Monday 1975 Dorothy Reynolds as Comtesse de la Brière in What Every Woman Knows 1976 Lynn Farleigh as Charlotte in A Room with a View 1977 Sheila Gish as four parts in Confusions 1978 Suzanne Bertish as Octavia in All for Love 1979 Maxine Audley as Olive in Here Comes Trouble 1980 Felicity Kendal as Constanze in Amadeus 1981 Sinéad Cusack as Celia in As You Like It 1982 Barbara Leigh-Hunt as Gertrude in Hamlet 1983 Sylvia Coleridge as Em in Clay 1984 Nichola McAuliffe as Queen Victoria in Poppy 1985 Zoë Wanamaker as Kattrin in Mother Courage 1986 Imelda Staunton as Bessie Watley in The Corn Is Green 1987 Patricia Hayes as Maria Josepha in The House of Bernarda Alba 1988 Barbara Jefford as Falathiel Trennanigan in Ting Tang Mine 1989 Sarah Woodward as Sophie in Artist Descending a Staircase 1990 Linda Kerr-Scott as Djigan in Ghetto 1991 Lesley Manville as Natasha in Three Sisters 1992 Celia Imrie as Jessica Tilehouse in The Sea 1993 Helen Burns as Karen Frick in The Last Yankee 1994 Sara Kestelman as Fraulein Schneider in Cabaret 1995 Susan Engel as Mrs Heidleberg in The Clandestine Marriage 1996 Sophie Thompson as Amy in Company 1997 Aisling O'Sullivan as The Wild Young Woman in The Cripple of Inishmaan 1998 Miriam Karlin as Zofia in Tongue of a Bird 1999 Faith Brook as Mother in Good 2000 Kika Markham as Hilda Latymer in A Song at Twilight 2001 Linda Bassett as Harper in Far Away 2002 Marcia Warren as Mercy Lott in Humble Boy 2003 Amanda Drew as Gertrude in Eastward Ho! 2004 Dilys Laye as Madame de Rosemond in Les liaisons dangereuses 2005 Jaye Griffiths as Emilia in Othello 2006 Amanda Harris as Celia in As You Like It 2007 Sheila Hancock as Fraulein Schneider in Cabaret 2008 Pam Ferris as Phoebe in The Entertainer 2009 Phoebe Nicholls as Frances Trebell in Waste and Helen Seville in The Vortex 2010  Josefina Gabrielle as Ursula in Sweet Charity 2011  Sheridan Smith as Doris in Flare Path 2012 Vinette Robinson as Ophelia in Hamlet 2013 Fenella Woolgar as Thea Elvsted in Hedda Gabler 2014 June Watson as Mammy in The Cripple of Inishmaan and Nanny in Before the Party 2015 Deborah Findlay as Volumnia in Coriolanus 2017 Sheila Atim as Ferdinand in The Tempest and the Woman in Les Blancs; Kate O'Flynn as Laura Wingfield in The Glass Menagerie 2018 Michelle Fairley as Cassius in Julius Caesar''
 2019 Lucy Briers for her portrayal of Mrs Helseth in Rosmersholm at the Duke of York's Theatre

Student Award
 2015 Scott Lyons
 2015 Danielle Whitfield
 2018 Sophie Harris
 2018 David Perkins
 2019 Elizabeth Hammerton
 2019 Vincent Rosec
 2020 Sharune
 2020 Joseph Scatley

Young Student Award
 2015 Joanne Gale
 2015 Luke Hallgarten
 2018 Tessa Carmody
 2018 Sam Elwin
 2019 Jonny Grundy
 2019 Constance Wookey
 2020 Jefferson Parlett
 2020 Abigail Carter-Simpson

References

External links

Clarence Derwent Award winners 1948-2008, United Kingdom

Actors' Equity Association
American theater awards